A Better Life is the second and final studio album by British garage rock band, Spring King. The album was released on 31 August 2018 through Island Records.

Track listing

References 

2018 albums
Spring King albums
Island Records albums